The Aldo Beckman Award for Journalistic Excellence is an annual award sponsored by the White House Correspondents Association. Established in 1981, it recognizes "a correspondent who personifies the journalistic excellence and personal qualities of Aldo Beckman". Described by CBS News as "one of journalism's most prestigious awards", past recipients include David E. Sanger, Mark Knoller, Glenn Thrush, Kenneth T. Walsh, and Carl M. Cannon.

References

American journalism awards